"The Meat Eaters" is a 2010 essay by the American philosopher Jeff McMahan, published as an op-ed in The New York Times. In the essay, McMahan asserts that humans have a moral obligation to stop eating meat and, in a conclusion considered to be controversial, that humans also have a duty to prevent predation by individuals who belong to carnivorous species, if we can do so without inflicting greater harm overall.

Background 
McMahan was inspired to write on the topic by discussions with the moral philosopher Oscar Horta, who introduced him to the topic of wild animal suffering. McMahan considered the issue to be significant and was given the opportunity to write a blog piece for "the research triangle", based in North Carolina, which The New York Times also published.

Summary 
McMahan argues that humans should stop eating animals because it is inherently harmful and morally indefensible; he also asserts that the suffering that animals experience in the wild is morally relevant and that we should intervene to reduce this suffering when we have the means to do so. Following this view, McMahan contends that humans have an obligation to prevent carnivorous animals from preying on other animals and addresses caveats around this idea, as well as defending against a number of counter-arguments. He concludes by embracing the "heretical" conclusion that engineering the extinction of carnivorous species would be morally good, if it could be carried out without causing more harm than the suffering that would be prevented.

Reception 
McMahan's argument has been described as "interesting to consider", if people are willing to suspend their disbelief. The essay has also been called "thought-provoking" and described as making a plausible argument for at least a drastic reduction in the number of individuals who belong to carnivorous species, as well as the changing of carnivorous species to become herbivorous. It has been asserted that McMahan's arguments are consequentialist, but the essay actually operates within a rights-based framework.

One critic labelled McMahan a "poor armchair ecologist"; another asserted that: "McMahan's advocacy reflects an unhealthy obsession with suffering that I think is hurting society." Negative reactions to the essay have been described as revealing how "deeply rooted the prejudice that we shouldn't go 'against nature' seems to be."

In the same year, McMahan published a follow-up essay, "Predators: A Response", in which he responds to the objections of his critics and employs a thought experiment which asks whether it would be good to allow the Siberian tiger, an already endangered carnivorous species, to go extinct. McMahan later published his arguments as "The Moral Problem of Predation", in the 2015 book Philosophy Comes to Dinner. "The Meat Eaters" was included in The Stone Reader: Modern Philosophy in 133 Arguments, edited by Simon Critchley and Peter Catapano.

See also 
 Ethics of eating meat
 Predation problem

References

External links 
 "The Meat Eaters"
 "Predators: A Response"
 The Meat Eaters—An Exploration in Ethics - Teaching materials

2010 essays
Animal rights mass media
Essays about wild animal suffering
Vegetarian-related mass media
Works originally published in The New York Times